Esteban Gallard (January 1, 1901 – October 7, 1929) was a Cuban boxer who found international fame under the nickname Kid Charol. While Charol never won a world boxing title, he did obtain popularity, especially in Argentina where he lived for the last years of his life after moving there from his Cuban hometown of Sagua la Grande. He had a relatively short boxing career before dying at age 28, holding only 67 bouts in an era when many boxers logged more than 100 career fights.

Professional career
Charol began his professional boxing career May 20, 1922, when he outpointed Fabio Lameida over eight rounds in Sagua, Cuba. For his third bout, November 1 of the same year, he faced a boxer named Kid Shadow. In his first professional bout abroad, Kid Charol knocked Kid Shadow out, apparently in the first round, at Panama. However, while most records point at this to be a first-round knockout, it remains unclear whether this knockout victory was actually achieved in the first round.

His next bout is said to have taken place on December 1, also in Panama. According to records, he beat Kid Brown in the first round that day, but, once again, the round in which the fight was over, and, in this case also, the actual date of the Charol-Brown bout, remain unclear. Kid Charol fought during an era when boxing records and the such were not always updated.

On January 1, 1923, Charol was held winless for the first time in his career, Enrique Ponce De Leon managing to fight to a ten-round draw (tie) with Charol.

Three more victories followed, and then, on August 25, he faced "Cuco Morales". Morales apparently insisted on fouling Kid Charol by hitting him low, and was disqualified in the second round.

Charol won three and drew one of his next four bouts, and then, on February 16, 1924, he was defeated for the first time, losing to Jimmy Finley by a fifteen-round decision in Havana. On his next fight, March 15 of the same year, Charol won the Cuban Middleweight title, when he knocked Rafael Fello Rodriguez in the fifth round of a rematch. Their first bout had ended in a fifteen-round draw.

Next, on April 1, he apparently fought a Homer Robertson. Whether this fight actually happened or not is also a mystery; some records show that Charol beat Robertson by a fifth-round knockout; other Kid Charol records do not list this fight as happening at all.

Kid Charol won four more fights, then headed to South America permanently. His first fight there, against Victor Alba, also has a mystery element, because, although it is believed that it took place on January 1, 1925, the date of the bout is not exactly known. Charol did defeat Alba by a first-round knockout in Lima, Peru.

On March 1, Kid Charol supposedly knocked out Alex Rely, also in Lima, in another fight whose exact date is not known.

After those two bouts, Charol moved on to Chile, fighting in Santiago three times. Once again, his first bout there, against Victor Contreras, happened without an exact date given on records, but it is generally believed that Charol outpointed Contreras over ten rounds in June 1925.

Charol returned to Cuba for one bout, defeating Abdel El Kebir by a fourth-round knockout on January 30, 1926. The very next day, he may have fought Jamaica's Peter Sung, winning by a ninth-round knockout. No proof exists that the fight with Sung ever happened, but a Jamaican newspaper published a story about it.

Charol won his next four fights, before moving to Argentina. On November 13, 1926, he made his Argentine debut by knocking Alejandro Trias out in five rounds at Buenos Aires.

On December 10, Charo dropped Luis Gaitieri ten times before stopping Gaitieri in the seventh round. Next came two fight trilogies that were sandwiched: Charol lost and drew with Michele Bonaglia before fighting three consecutive bouts with Eduardo Brissett. Having beaten Brissett once and drawn with him twice, Charol then faced Bonaglia for the third time, losing a twelve-round decision.

By then, Charol was starting to develop tuberculosis. It was during this time that his popularity among Argentine boxing fans rose even more, because, despite the fact that the public was aware of his illness, he fought on, winning three more bouts.

Charol's condition worsened, and by 1929, he started to spend a lot of time in a hospital. He managed, however, to keep training, and secured a fight with future International Boxing Hall of Fame member Dave Shade, who traveled to Argentina for the bout. Charol was hospitalized when he was asked if he wanted to fight with Chade. He was in critical condition when Chade arrived in Argentina. Despite these facts, Charol discharged himself from the hospital days before the bout, and he held Chade to a twelve-round draw, in a fight held on April 30 of that year.

This would turn out to be Charol's last fight, as his condition kept on worsening until he died five and a half months later, on October 7, in Buenos Aires.

Kid Charol had a record of 53 wins, 3 losses and 10 draws, with 34 wins by knockout.

Professional boxing record

See also

 List of Cubans

External links

References

1901 births
1929 deaths
People from Sagua la Grande
Middleweight boxers
Cuban male boxers
20th-century deaths from tuberculosis
Tuberculosis deaths in Argentina